Clarendon Park may refer to:

England
Clarendon Park, Epsom, Surrey, England; see Residents Associations of Epsom and Ewell
Clarendon Park, Leicester, Leicestershire, England
Clarendon Park, Oxshott, Surrey, England; see Long Grove Hospital
Clarendon Park, Wiltshire, England
 A park in Pendleton, Greater Manchester

Other places
Clarendon Park, Jamaica
 A neighborhood in Uptown, Chicago, Illinois, United States

Fictional places
 A fictional estate in the 1834 Maria Edgeworth novel Helen